Damdim railway station is the railway station which serves the areas of Dam Dim lying on Doars region in the Indian state of West Bengal. It lies in the New Jalpaiguri–Alipurduar–Samuktala Road line of Northeast Frontier Railway zone, Alipurduar railway division.

Trains
Major trains running from Damdim Railway Station are as follows:

Siliguri Bamanhat Intercity Express.
Siliguri–Alipurduar Intercity Express

References

Railway stations in West Bengal
Alipurduar railway division